The Mayor of the City of Plano, Texas is the head of the Plano City Council. The current mayor is John B. Muns, who has served since 2021 and is the city's 39th mayor.

Serving as mayor is a part-time job, and most officeholders maintain a full-time job if they are not retired. The City Manager is responsible for day-to-day city operations.

Term of Office
The Mayor of Plano served one-year terms until 1884, when the term was extended to two years. In 2006, the use of three-year terms began. The term was changed to four years in 2011.  As of 2023, a mayor may only serve two terms, for a total of 8 years.

History
In 1881, the city's first mayor C. J. Kellner received $10 per year as compensation, partly as the "rental fee" of barn for meetings. In 1884, the salary was approved to officially be $72 per year.

As of 2021, the mayor is paid $2,000 per month, while city council members receive $1,000.

Namesakes
Below are buildings located in Plano that are named for mayors. Namesake schools are part of the Plano Independent School District.

 A. R. Schell, Jr. Elementary School
 Conner Harrington Republican Women 
 David B. McCall, Jr. Elementary School
 David B. McCall, Jr. Plaza
 Fred Schimelpfenig Middle School 
 Harry Rowlinson Community Natatorium
 J. A. Harrington Elementary School
 Norman F. Whitsitt Parkway (FM 544/15th Street)
 Olney Davis Elementary School

List of Mayors

See also

 Plano City Council
 Timeline of Plano, Texas

References

 
Plano, Texas